Collège-des-Frères, also known as Frères Bab el-Louk, is a French school in Bab al-Louq, a neighborhood in downtown Cairo. It is one of six Lasallian schools in Egypt of which four are located in Cairo and two in Alexandria.

History 
On June 3, 1888, two brothers, Les Frères (French for "the brothers"), began their mission at St. Joseph school near St. Joseph church at Banque Misr St. in Downtown Cairo. The first class had two students. 
 1900 - on the canonization of St. Jean-Baptiste de la Salle, the school changed its name to the name of the founder of the Brothers, and it became Jean-Baptiste de la Salle school.
 1906 - Les Frères bought the property of Moustafa Fahmy Pasha which is the current site of the school, in Bab al-Louq, one of the oldest districts of Cairo.
 1908 - the construction of a new building started.
 1914 - the first mass was conducted on March 25.
 1917 - the number of students reached 300.
 1918 - school included 10 classes, with two others for the free school St Antoine in the place of the current division of the Nursery school. 
 1922 - the number of students reached 500.
 1992 - a new building was constructed along Falaky street to receive students of the secondary cycle that made it possible for the students to continue their secondary studies within their own establishment. Computer labs, and Science labs, as well as video rooms were built.

Patron saint

St. Jean-Baptiste de la Salle 
see: Jean-Baptiste de la Salle
St. Jean-Baptiste de la Salle was born in Rheims, France on April 30, 1651. He was 29 years old when he realized that the educational system of his day was inadequate to meet the needs of the poor children of seventeenth century France. To provide a Christian and human education, De La Salle founded a religious community of men, the Brothers of the Christian Schools (Fratres Scholarum Christianarum), dedicated to the instruction of youth, especially the poor. De La Salle died on Good Friday, April 7, 1719. He was canonized a saint of the Catholic Church in 1900 and declared "Universal Patron of All Teachers" by  Pope Pius XII in 1950. The feast of St. Jean-Baptiste de La Salle is celebrated on 15 May by the worldwide Lasallian movement.

See also
:Category:Collège des Frères (Bab al-Louq) alumni
Lasallian educational institutions
Collège Saint Marc, Alexandria
Education in Egypt

External links
 Collège-des-Frères (Bab-El-Louk) Official website. 
 Collège-des-Frères (Bab el-Louk) History. 

Education in Cairo
Cairo
Private schools in Cairo
Educational institutions established in 1888
1888 establishments in Egypt